Peerless Lake is an unincorporated community in northern Alberta, Canada.

The community is under the jurisdiction of the Municipal District of Opportunity No. 17 and is located in the federal riding of Fort McMurray-Athabasca.

Demographics 

Education 
The community has a centre for higher education, Northern Lakes College, which offers a variety of programs using distance education technology and computer mediated instruction.

See also 
List of communities in Alberta
List of designated places in Alberta

References 

Designated places in Alberta
Localities in the Municipal District of Opportunity No. 17